The 2021 Copa do Brasil Finals were the final two-legged tie that decided the 2021 Copa do Brasil, the 33rd season of the Copa do Brasil, Brazil's national cup football tournament organised by the Brazilian Football Confederation.

The finals were contested in a two-legged home-and-away format between Atlético Mineiro, from Minas Gerais, and Athletico Paranaense, from Paraná. Both teams disputed their third Copa do Brasil finals.

A draw by CBF was held on 4 November 2021 to determine the home-and-away teams for each leg. The first leg was hosted by Atlético Mineiro at Mineirão in Belo Horizonte on 12 December 2021, while the second leg was hosted by Athletico Paranaense at Arena da Baixada in Curitiba on 15 December 2021.

Atlético Mineiro defeated Athletico Paranaense 6–1 on aggregate in the finals to win their second title. As champions, Atlético Mineiro qualified for the 2022 Copa Libertadores group stage and the 2022 Copa do Brasil third round. As Atlético Mineiro also won the 2021 Campeonato Brasileiro Série A, they played in the 2022 Supercopa do Brasil against the 2021 Campeonato Brasileiro Série A runners-up.

Teams

Road to the final

Note: In all scores below, the score of the home team is given first.

Format
In the finals, the teams played a single-elimination tournament with the following rules:
The finals were played on a home-and-away two-legged basis. The home-and-away teams for both legs were determined by a draw held on 4 November 2021 at the CBF headquarters in Rio de Janeiro, Brazil.
If tied on aggregate, the away goals rule and extra time would not be used and the penalty shoot-out would be used to determine the winners. (Regulations Article 20).

Matches

First leg

Second leg

See also
2021 Campeonato Brasileiro Série A

References

2021
Finals
Copa do Brasil Finals
Clube Atlético Mineiro matches
Club Athletico Paranaense matches